Millard County is a county in the U.S. state of Utah. As of the 2010 United States Census, the population was 12,503. Its county seat is Fillmore, and the largest city is Delta.

History
The Utah Territory legislature created the county on October 4, 1851, with territory not previously covered by county creations and including some area in the future state of Nevada. It was named for the thirteenth US President Millard Fillmore, who was in office then. Fillmore was designated as the county seat. The county boundaries were altered in 1852 and again in 1854. On March 2, 1861, the US government created the Nevada Territory, which effectively de-annexed the described portion of Millard County falling in that Territorial Proclamation. The county boundary was further altered in 1862, 1866, 1888, and in 1919. In 1921 a boundary adjustment with Sevier brought Millard to its present configuration.

Fillmore, located near the geographic center of the territory, was originally built as the capital of Utah Territory. The Utah Territorial Legislature approved a plan to locate the capital in the Pahvant Valley. On October 28, 1851, Utah Governor Brigham Young traveled to the valley and chose the specific site for Fillmore. The town was surveyed that same day. A colonizing company soon followed; they built houses, a grist mill, and a sawmill. Construction of the Territorial Statehouse was initiated in 1852. The Territorial legislature met in Fillmore for the first (and only time) in 1855. The following year they voted to keep the capital in Great Salt Lake City.

Geography
Millard County lies on the west side of Utah. Its west border abuts the east border of the state of Nevada. The county terrain consists of arid, rough undulating flatlands interrupted by numerous hills and mountain ridges. The highest point in the county is Mine Camp Peak in the Central Utah Plateaus, at  ASL. It is the third-largest county in Utah by area.

The Sevier Desert covers much of Millard County, being the seafloor of ancient Lake Bonneville. Sevier Lake, a mostly dry remnant of Lake Bonneville, is in central Millard County. The Pahvant Mountains form the county's eastern boundary. Fillmore and other farming communities lie at the base of the Pahvant Mountains. Delta sits several miles from the banks of the Sevier River in the middle of the basin.

Major highways

 Interstate 15
 Interstate 70
 US 6
 US 50
 Utah State U-21
 Utah State U-100
 Utah State U-125
 Utah State U-132
 Utah State U-133
 Utah State U-136
 Utah State U-257

Adjacent counties

 Juab County - north
 Sanpete County - northeast
 Sevier County - southeast
 Beaver County - south
 Lincoln County, Nevada - southwest
 White Pine County, Nevada - west

Protected areas

 Circus Hollow Wildlife Management Area
 Clear Lake Waterfowl Management Area
 Fishlake National Forest (part)
 Halfway Hill Wildlife Management Area

Lakes

 Abraham Reservoir
 Alexander Lake
 Antelope Spring (along Cove Creek)
 Antelope Spring Reservoir
 AT T Road Reservoir
 Beaver River Reservoir
 Big Drum Reservoir
 Big Sage Reservoir
 Bitterweed Lake
 Black Point Reservoir
 Black Spring
 Bloom Trail Reservoir
 Borden Basin Reservoir
 Burnt Tree Pond
 Carr Lake
 Cat Canyon Reservoir
 Cedar Pass Reservoir
 Chokecherry Reservoir
 Clay Knoll Reservoir
 Clear Lake
 Clear Spot Reservoirs
 Coates Reservoir
 Cockleburr Lake
 Confusion Hills Reservoir
 Conger Reservoir
 Construction Reservoir
 Coyote Spring (near Beaver River)
 Coyote Spring (Tule Valley)
 Crafts Lake
 Crater Reservoir
 Cricket Reservoir
 Cricket Reservoir Number 2
 D M A D Reservoir
 Danish Reservoir
 Deadman Reservoir
 Deep Lake
 Deseret Reservoirs
 Devils Kitchen Reservoir
 East Antelope Reservoir
 East Hardpan Reservoir
 East Tule Bench Reservoir
 Ecks Knoll Reservoir
 Fillmore Wash Reservoir
 Fool Creek Number Two Reservoir
 Fool Creek Reservoir Number 1
 Foote Reservoir
 Georges Reservoir
 Greener Reservoir
 Gunnison Bend Reservoir
 Halls Double Reservoir
 Hardpan Reservoir
 Headquarters Reservoir
 Highway Reservoir
 Hinckley Trail Reservoir
 Hodgsen Pond
 Hole-in-the-Rock Reservoir
 Horsetrap Reservoir
 Indian Queen Reservoir
 Indian Ranch
 Jackson Pond
 Jensen Spring
 Johnson Pond
 Lakeview Reservoir
 Lawson Cove Reservoir
 Little Drum Reservoir
 Long Ridge Reservoir
 Lower Clay Spring
 Madsen Reservoir
 Miller Canyon Reservoir
 Mormon Gap Reservoir
 Mud Flat Reservoir
 Mud Lake Spring
 Mud Springs
 Needle Hardpan Reservoir
 Needle Reservoir
 Neels Reservoir Number 2
 Nelson Reservoir Number 2
 Nielson Pond
 North Clay Knoll Reservoir
 North Knoll Spring
 Pine Pass Reservoir
 Pony Express Reservoir
 Preuss Lake
 Probst Pond
 Rain Lakes
 Red Rock Number 1 Reservoir
 Red Rock Number 2 Reservoir
 Robins Lake
 Ruths Pond
 Salt Lake
 Salt Marsh Lake
 Scipio Lake
 Sevier Lake
 Sevier Lake Reservoir
 Sevier Lake Reservoir Number 1
 Sevier Lake Reservoir Number 4
 Sevier Lake Reservoir Number 5
 Sevier Lake Reservoir Number 6
 Smelter Knolls Reservoir
 Snake Pass Reservoir
 Soap Hollow Reservoir
 Soap Wash Reservoir
 South Cedar Wash Reservoir
 South Horse Hollow Reservoir
 South Tule Spring
 Spring Lake
 Squidike Spring
 Stage Road Reservoir
 Steamboat Pass Reservoir
 Styler Reservoir
 Swan Lake
 Swan Lake Salt Marsh
 Swasey Hardpan Reservoir
 Swasey Reservoir Number 2
 Swasey Reservoir Number 3
 Swasey Reservoir Number 4
 Swasey Wash Reservoir
 Tamarack Reservoir
 The Lakes
 Thompson Knoll Reservoir
 Topaz Slough
 Tule Spring
 Twin Springs
 Warm Springs
 Watsons Cow Pond
 West Clay Knoll Reservoir
 West Marshall Tract Reservoir
 West Neels Reservoir
 Whirlwind Reservoir
 Willow Spring (near Tule Spring)

Great Stone Face

Pahvant Valley in Millard County has several ancient lava flows and extinct volcanoes, known as the Black Rock Desert volcanic field, including the "Black Rock" lava flow. About 17 miles (27 km) southwest of Delta, near Black Rock's northwest perimeter is a feature named the "Great Stone Face", which protrudes about four stories above the general elevation. Locals claim that this rock formation, when viewed at the correct angle, appears similar to a profile of Joseph Smith. At ground level, within view of the "Great Stone Face", is a large, smooth-faced rock covered in Native American petroglyphs.

Notch Peak
Notch Peak is 50 miles (80 km) west of Delta. The skyline appears to have a notch taken out of it when viewed from Delta.

Little Sahara Sand Dunes
Little Sahara Recreation Area, 25 miles (40 km) north of Delta, is a popular area for ATV riders.

Demographics

As of the 2000 United States Census, there were 12,405 people, 3,840 households, and 3,091 families in the county. The population density was 1.89/sqmi (0.73/km2). There were 4,522 housing units at an average density of 0.69/sqmi (0.27/km2).
In 2000 there were 3,840 households, of which 46.10% had children under 18 living with them, 70.60% were married couples living together, 7.10% had a female householder with no husband present, and 19.50% were non-families. 18.30% of all households were made up of individuals, and 10.10% had someone living alone who was 65 years of age or older. The average household size was 3.19, and the average family size was 3.66.

The county population contained 37.30% under 18, 8.00% from 18 to 24, 22.90% from 25 to 44, 19.40% from 45 to 64, and 12.30% who were 65 years of age or older. The median age was 30 years. For every 100 females, there were 104.90 males. For every 100 females aged 18 and over, there were 101.90 males.

The median income for a household in the county was $36,178, and the median income for a family was $41,797. Males had a median income of $36,989 versus $20,168 for females. The per capita income for the county was $13,408.  About 9.40% of families and 13.10% of the population were below the poverty line, including 17.20% of those under age 18 and 7.20% of those aged 65 or over.

The 2000 Census reported the racial makeup of the county was 93.94% White, 0.10% Black or African American, 1.31% Native American, 0.48% Asian, 0.20% Pacific Islander, 2.76% from other races, and 1.21% from two or more races. 7.18% of the population were Hispanic or Latino of any race.

By 2005, 86.7% of Millard County's population was non-Hispanic whites. The proportion of African Americans had doubled to 0.2%. Native Americans were now 1.5% of the country's population. Asians had fallen to only 0.4% of the population. 11.0% of the population was Latino, just above the 10.9% for Utah.

As of 2010, Millard County had a population of 12,310. The ethnic and racial makeup of the population was 84.7% non-Hispanic white, 0.1% black, 1.0% Native American, 0.6% Asian, 0.1% Pacific Islander, 1.5% reporting two or more races, and 12.8% Hispanic or Latino.

Economy

Millard County is working hard to make it easier to build Earthships, straw bale homes, and other ecological and sustainable housing.

Millard County is the home of the Telescope Array Project ultra-high-energy cosmic ray observatory. The Lon and Mary Watson Millard County Cosmic Ray Center was dedicated on March 20, 2006.

Japanese internment camp
The location is open to the public, with a memorial at the northwest corner.

Politics and Government
Millard County has traditionally voted Republican. In no national election since 1944 has the county selected the Democratic Party candidate (as of 2020).

Communities

Cities
 Delta
 Fillmore (county seat)

Towns

 Hinckley
 Holden
 Kanosh
 Leamington
 Lynndyl
 Meadow
 Oak City
 Scipio

Census-designated places
 Deseret
 Oasis
 Sutherland

Unincorporated communities

 Abraham
 Black Rock
 Border
 Burbank
 Cove Fort
 EskDale
 Flowell
 Fool Creek
 Gandy
 Garrison
 Hatton
 McCornick
 Sugarville
 Woodrow

Former communities
 Bloom
 Borden
 Clear Lake
 Greenwood
 Ibex
 Sunflower
 Topaz
 Van

Gallery

See also 
 Cove Fort, Utah
 National Register of Historic Places listings in Millard County, Utah
 USS Millard County (LST-987)
 Willden Fort

References

External links

 

 
1851 establishments in Utah Territory
Populated places established in 1851
Great Basin National Heritage Area